Melaleuca sylvana is a plant in the myrtle family Myrtaceae and is endemic to a small area near Ravenshoe in Queensland, Australia. It is a newly described (2004) species similar to Melaleuca monantha with its tiny leaves and heads of white flowers but is a larger, single stemmed shrub or tree with a less dense crown.

Description 
Its leaves are arranged in alternating pairs (decussate), so that there are four rows of leaves along the stems.

The flowers are white and arranged in heads or short spikes between the leaves on the fresh growth. The stamens are arranged in five bundles around the flower with 9 to 12 stamens per bundle.

Taxonomy and naming
Melaleuca sylvana was first formally described in 2004 by Craven and Andrew Ford in Muelleria from a specimen collected on a powerline access road near Herberton.  The specific epithet (sylvana) is from the Latin word sylva (or silva) meaning "wood" or "forest" referring to the most frequent habitat of this species.

Distribution and habitat
This melaleuca occurs in the Ravenshoe and Herberton districts where it grows in heath, forest and woodland often on soils derived from rhyolite.

Ecology

Response to fire
After fire, Melaleuca sylvana resprouts at the stem base and along stems from epicormic buds.

References

sylvana
Myrtales of Australia
Flora of Queensland
Plants described in 2004